The 61st 500 Mile International Sweepstakes was held at the Indianapolis Motor Speedway in Speedway, Indiana on Sunday, May 29, 1977. Considered one of the most historically significant editions of the Indianapolis 500, several sidebar stories complemented the unprecedented accomplishment of race winner A. J. Foyt. Foyt became the first driver to win the Indianapolis 500 four times. As of 2022, Foyt's record has been tied by Al Unser Sr.,  Rick Mears and Hélio Castroneves, but still stands as an Indy 500 record. Foyt's victory is also the last time the winning car (both chassis and engine) was built entirely within the United States.

The race was sanctioned by USAC, and was part of the 1977 USAC National Championship Trail. After rain-shortened races in three of the past four years (1973, 1975, 1976), the 1977 race was run the full distance under hot and sunny conditions.

Two major stories headlined qualifying. During time trials, Tom Sneva won the pole position with a new track record. He became the first driver to break the 200 mph barrier at the Speedway. On the final day of time trials, Janet Guthrie broke the gender barrier by becoming the first female driver to qualify for the Indy 500.

During the summer of 1976, the entire track was repaved in asphalt. It marked the first time since the original brick surface was laid in the fall of 1909 that the Indianapolis Motor Speedway was repaved in its entirety. The surface was allowed to cure over the winter, and during a tire test in March, Gordon Johncock ran a lap of 200.401 mph, an unofficial track record.

This would be the final Indy 500 for track owner Tony Hulman, who would die of heart failure on October 27, 1977. IMS Radio Network anchor Sid Collins did not call the race for the first time since 1951. Collins committed suicide on May 2, just five days before opening day, after being diagnosed with ALS. Collins was replaced by new "Voice of the 500" Paul Page.

Other historical milestones during the month included the first grandson of a former driver entering (Teddy Pilette) and the first father and son combination attempting to qualify for the same race (Jim and James McElreath Jr.). However, neither Pilette (grandson of 1913 competitor Théodore Pilette) nor McElreath Jr. succeeded in making the field.

Race schedule

Time trials

Pole Day – Saturday May 14
During the first week of practice, several drivers flirted with the elusive 200 mph barrier. Mario Andretti, A. J. Foyt, and Johnny Rutherford all ran unofficial practice laps over 200 mph. All three became immediate favorites for the pole position. Going into the month, the official one-lap track record was still 199.071 mph, set by Johnny Rutherford back in 1973.

Pole day was sunny and warm, and an estimated 200,000 spectators arrived anticipating a record-setting day. No drivers broke the 200 mph barrier during practice on the morning of pole day, but participants and observers expected the record to fall during official time trials. At 11:00 a.m., A. J. Foyt was the first driver to make an attempt. His four-lap speed of 193.465 mph was far short of the record. Al Unser Sr. (195.950 mph) went faster and took over the top spot about a half hour later.

At 11:51 a.m., Tom Sneva took to the track. He set new all-time one-lap and four-lap track records. He became the first driver to break the 200 mph barrier at Indianapolis.
Lap 1 – 44.91 seconds, 200.401 mph (new 1-lap track record)
Lap 2 – 44.88 seconds, 200.535 mph (new 1-lap track record)
Lap 3 – 45.54 seconds, 197.628 mph
Lap 4 – 45.68 seconds, 197.032 mph
Total – 3:01.01, 198.884 mph (new 4-lap track record)
Though his last two laps dropped off, Sneva's four-lap average was fast enough to secure the pole position. Sneva was rewarded by having 200 silver dollars poured into his helmet. The symbolic gesture, performed by Phil Hedback of Bryant Heating and Cooling Company, mimicked Parnelli Jones, who broke the 150 mph barrier in 1962, and was awarded with 150 silver dollars poured into his helmet.

About an hour later, USAC officials retracted A. J. Foyt's qualifying time. During post-inspection, they discovered that his pop-off valve was fractured and malfunctioned. Since the infraction was not Foyt's fault, he was allowed to re-qualify. Foyt's speed of 194.563 mph was faster than his previous attempt, and he would line up 4th.

Bobby Unser (197.618 mph) put himself in the middle of the front row, bumping his brother Al to the outside. Johnny Rutherford, an early favorite for the front row, waved off his first run, then stalled on his second run. The day ended with the field filled to 16 cars, with Rutherford among those not qualified. Sneva was the only driver to run any laps over 200 mph all afternoon.

Second Day – Sunday May 15
Johnny Rutherford (197.325 mph) put in the third-fastest speed in the field, but as a second day qualifier, he was forced to line up behind the first day qualifiers in 17th position.

Five cars completed runs, filling the field to 21 cars. Clay Regazzoni wrecked during his attempt, but was not seriously injured. Regazzoni was planning on running both Indy and the Monaco Grand Prix, but the crash complicated his travel schedule.

Third Day – Saturday May 21
Clay Regazzoni started the day in Monte Carlo, but rain washed out his chance to qualify for the Monaco Grand Prix. Car owner Teddy Yip made plans to fly him back to Indy and attempt to qualify for the 500. Mario Andretti, who put in a safe qualifying time at Indy the weekend before, remained in Monaco to compete in the race, he would finish 5th.

Qualifying was sparse during the early parts of the day, with at least 12 cars taking to the track, but only two attempts run to completion. At the end of the day, the field was filled to 27 cars. Clay Regazzoni did not make it to the Speedway in enough time, and he would have to wait until Sunday.

Bump Day – Sunday May 22
The final day of time trials became a historic milestone in auto racing history. Janet Guthrie was the first car to take the track, and she became the first female driver to qualify for the Indianapolis 500. Her four-lap average of 188.403 mph put her safely in the field, and she was the fastest car of the afternoon. Like he did for Tom Sneva a week earlier, Phil Hedback poured 188 silver dollars in her helmet, matching her qualifying speed, which was also a female closed-course speed record.

After a hectic travel burden, Clay Regazzoni finally put a car in the field.

At about 3:30 p.m., Salt Walther (184.549 mph) completed a run, followed later by Bubby Jones (184.938 mph), and the field was filled to 33 cars. Cliff Hucul (187.198 mph) bumped out Walther. With about an hour to go, Eldon Rasmussen bumped out Vern Schuppan, and John Mahler bumped out Joe Saldana.

The final hour of qualifying saw several drivers try, but fail, to bump their way in. Young rookie Rick Mears was too slow on his two attempts, and he failed to qualify. Jim Hurtubise once again was the center of attention for a few minutes, as he rolled out his Mallard/Offy to the qualifying line. After one slow lap he waved off, and it was the final qualifying attempt ever made by a front-engined car at Indy.

As the 6 o'clock gun fired, James McElreath, Jr. was the final car on the track, but his speed was too slow to make the field. Jim and James, Jr. were trying to become the first father and son to qualify for the same Indy 500. James, Jr. fell short, however, and would die in a sprint car crash later in the year, never having a chance to race together.

Carburetion Day – Thursday May 26
After qualifying closed, the team of Salt Walther purchased the qualified car of Bill Puterbaugh from owner Lee Elkins. Salt's father George and brother Jeff were responsible for the purchase, and paid a reported $60,000 for the entry, and subsequently fired Puterbaugh from the ride. Salt Walther was named the new driver for the car, and it was repainted in his livery. According to the rules, the car would have to move to the rear of the field on race day. Almost immediately, the situation received significant negative criticism. A day later, Puterbaugh was reinstated to the ride, therefore Puterbaugh was reinstated to his 28th starting position.

The final practice day saw Johnny Rutherford (194.533 mph) set the fastest lap. Mike Mosley was the only incident of the day, suffering a broken piston. Later in the afternoon, Jim McElreath's #73 Carrillo team won the first annual Miller Pit Stop Contest.

Starting lineup

Grid

Alternates
First alternate: Joe Saldana  (#64)

Failed to qualify

Larry Cannon (#67) (Drove relief during the race)
Ed Crombie  (#67)
Larry Dickson (#80)
Ed Finley  (#70)
Tom Frantz  (#88)
Spike Gehlhausen (#19)
Todd Gibson  (#22, #96)
Jerry Grant (#69, #75)
Bob Harkey (#88)
Jim Hurtubise (#56)
Gary Irvin  (#23)
Jerry Karl (#37, #57, #88)
Mel Kenyon (#88)
John Martin (#28)
Larry McCoy (#63)
James McElreath  (#26)
Graham McRae (#33)
Rick Mears  (#90)
Teddy Pilette  (#91)
Vern Schuppan (#15, #85)
Bill Simpson (#38)
Salt Walther (#33, #77)

 = Indianapolis 500 rookie = Former Indianapolis 500 winner

Race summary

Pre-race
After Janet Guthrie became the first female driver to qualify for the Indianapolis 500, controversy began to surround the famous starting command, "Gentlemen, start your engines!" Speedway management did not want to alter the traditional phrase. During the week before the race, the management announced that they would not change the wording of the command, but numerous suggestions were being offered by various promoters and members of the media around the country. Looking for an excuse, the management insisted that the cars were actually started by male crew members with an electric hand-held starter from behind the car. Guthrie and her crew were quite displeased by the stubbornness of the Speedway management, considering her unprecedented accomplishment. The crew reacted by assigning Kay Bignotti (wife of George Bignotti) as the crew member to operate the inertial starter at the back of Guthrie's car. The Speedway's argument fell apart, and they decided upon a special amended command for that year. They did not announce beforehand what the special command would be, and Hulman's highly anticipated phrase was the following:

The issues with the starting command were not Guthrie's only troubles. On the morning of the race, an official inspecting the pit area discovered that Guthrie's pit side fuel tank hose was leaking. Dripping methanol fuel was observed under the tank, and officials threatened to disqualify the team if they could not contain the leak. A hasty repair was made by wrapping a plastic bag around the hose, and the officials were satisfied.

First half
At the start, Al Unser swept from the outside of the front row, and led into turn one. Polesitter Tom Sneva grabbed second. Bobby Unser settled into third. Johnny Rutherford over-revved the engine, and dropped out with gearbox failure. Janet Guthrie was in the pits early with engine trouble. She would suffer a long day of numerous frustrating pits stops.

Gordon Johncock took the lead for the first time on lap 18. After Johncock pitted, A. J. Foyt led laps 27-51.

Lloyd Ruby crashed in turn two and brought out the yellow on lap 49. It would be Ruby's final Indy 500. During the sequence of pit stops, Gordon Johncock came to the lead, and led most of the laps to the midpoint.

Eldon Rasmussen brought out the yellow for a spin on lap 69. He was able to continue. It was only the second, and would be the last, on-track incident of the race. At the halfway point, attrition had taken its toll during the hot day. Only 17 cars were still running.

Second half
Gordon Johncock was the dominating leader in the second half. He took the lead again on lap 97, and led through lap 179. A. J. Foyt, Tom Sneva, and Al Unser were the closest pursuers.

A long stretch of green flag racing continued until lap 159, when George Snider and Pancho Carter stalled on the track.

After numerous attempts to re-join the race, Janet Guthrie finally dropped out on the leader's lap 149, having completed only 27 laps. On one of the many pit stops, fuel from the overflow hose leaked out and spilled into the cockpit. Guthrie's crew had to escort her back to the garage area and find a place for her to shower off in private (there were no women's restrooms in the garage area at the time) to clean off the spilled fuel prior to addressing the media.

Two cycles of pit stops remained for the leaders. Gordon Johncock continued to lead A. J. Foyt. Tom Sneva was also still on the lead lap. The three leaders made the next-to-last pits stops within one lap of each other. Johncock was beginning to complain of dehydration and heat exhaustion, and the crew doused him with water. Johncock, however, managed to return to the track with a lead of about 15–20 seconds.

Finish
With 20 laps to go, Johncock still led Foyt by 10 seconds. Sneva was lurking in third place. With Johncock physically ailing, A. J. Foyt began to close the margin. Johncock made his final stop on lap 181. He took on fuel only, and the crew again doused him with water. He pulled away after a 14.7 second stop. Two laps later, Foyt made his final stop. Foyt took on right side tires and fuel, and was away in only 12.9 seconds. Johncock re-assumed the lead, but it was down to only 7 seconds.

Suddenly as Johncock hit the mainstretch the next time around to complete lap 184, a huge cloud of smoke came from his car and he veered to the inside. Johncock parked the car in turn one with a broken crankshaft. Foyt inherited the lead with only 16 laps to go. Johncock climbed from his car, and hopped into the infield creek to splash some water on himself to cool off.

Foyt now held a nearly 30-second lead over second place Tom Sneva. Foyt was able to cruise comfortably over the final 15 laps and became the first driver to win the Indianapolis 500 four times.

Post race
The historic accomplishment was highly celebrated, and Foyt invited track owner Tony Hulman to ride with him in the pace car to salute the fans. It was one of the very few times that Tony Hulman rode with the winner of the race, and his last, as he died the following October.

Tom Sneva bettered his 6th place finish from the previous year to a solid 2nd place. He would ride this momentum by winning the Pocono 500 later in the season and win the 1977 National Drivers championship.

Race results

Box score

 = Indianapolis 500 rookie = Former Indianapolis 500 winner

All cars utilized Goodyear tires.

Race statistics

Source:

Points standings after the race

Broadcasting

Radio
The race was carried live on the IMS Radio Network. Following the suicide of chief announcer Sid Collins on May 2, Paul Page was elevated to the anchor position and became the new "Voice of the 500." Lou Palmer reported from victory lane. Fred Agabashian returned for his 12th and final year as the "driver expert." At the opening of the broadcast, veteran Jim Shelton reported on the death of Collins to the worldwide listening audience, then introduced Page as the new anchor.

Paul Page had been groomed by Sid Collins to be his eventual replacement. Despite the bereavement of the crew regarding Collins’ death, the broadcast was a flawless affair, and ushered in a new era for the network. In the coming years, Page would upgrade the workings of the broadcast, including enhanced communication with the reporters, and new talent at the positions.

This would be the 30th year for Jim Shelton on the crew, reporting from his familiar fourth turn position. Darl Wible debuted on the crew in 1977, reporting from the backstretch location. Bob Forbes served as the wireless roving reporter in the garages. Among the celebrities interviewed in the pits were Evel Knievel, Sam Hanks, and Formula One commentator Anthony Marsh.

Television
The race was carried in the United States on ABC Sports on a same-day tape delay basis. "Heavy Action" was used in an "Indianapolis 500" opening credits for the second time as Monday Night Football Producers Roone Arledge and Chuck Howard along with Directors Chet Forte and Larry Kamm also did work on this broadcast. Jim McKay anchored the broadcast. The broadcast took place in the midst of the National Association of Broadcast Employees and Technicians strike at ABC. Unlike previous years during this era, ABC-TV got the first interview with the race winner, as Bill Flemming spoke with A. J. Foyt prior to Lou Palmer.

The broadcast has re-aired in partiality on ESPN Classic since May 2011.

The broadcast is also available for free via the official IndyCar Series and official Indianapolis Motor Speedway YouTube channels.

Gallery

Notes

See also
 1977 USAC Championship Car season

References

Works cited
1977 Indianapolis 500 Press Information - Official Track Report
Indianapolis 500 History: Race & All-Time Stats - Official Site
1977 Indianapolis 500 at RacingReference.info
1977 Indianapolis 500 Radio Broadcast, Indianapolis Motor Speedway Radio Network

Indianapolis 500 races
Indianapolis 500
Indianapolis 500
1977 in American motorsport